Cressy can refer to:

Places
Cressy, Tasmania, Australia, a town
Electoral district of Cressy, a former electoral district of the Tasmanian House of Assembly 
Cressy, Victoria, Australia, a town
Cressy, Seine-Maritime, a commune in France
Cressy, Switzerland, a village in the municipality of Bernex, Switzerland
Cressy, California, former name of Cressey, California, United States, a census-designated place

Ships
, the name of four Royal Navy ships
Cressy class cruiser, a class of Royal Navy armoured cruisers
Cressy (ship), a passenger ship to New Zealand in 1850
Cressy, a narrowboat belonging to L. T. C. Rolt, credited with starting the restoration movement for English canals with the publication of Narrow Boat (1944)

People
Cressy (surname)

Events
Battle of Cressy, alternative rendering of the Battle of Crécy, one of the most significant battles of the Hundred Years' War

See also

Cressey (disambiguation)
Crecy (disambiguation)
Cressy by Bret Harte